A List of Slovak films of the 2000s.

Minority co-production participation:

References

External links
 Slovenská filmová databáza

2000s
Lists of 2000s films
Films